The Tehoro-class (テホロ) locomotives were a class of steam tender locomotives of the Chosen Government Railway (Sentetsu) with 4-6-0 wheel arrangement. The "Teho" name came from the American naming system for steam locomotives, under which locomotives with 4-6-0 wheel arrangement were called "Ten Wheeler".

After the Liberation of Korea, of the 178 surviving locomotives of all Teho classes - including six previously owned by private railway companies - 106 went to the Korean National Railroad in the South, and 72 to the Korean State Railway in the North.

Description
Having become indispensable on branchline use, it was decided to modernise the Teho type, and in 1925–26 local engineers developed a derivative locomotive. The result was the テホロ (Tehoro) class, the first of which was built in July 1927 and the second in October of the same year, both at Sentetsu's Gyeongseong Works. These featured a single-stage compressor, and improvements included the expansion of the heat transfer area, improved power transfer and brakes, an automated smoke box door, and other improvements. The Tehoro class was designed for use on both passenger and freight trains, and was used primarily on the Gyeongui and Gyeongbu lines. The next thirteen came in 1929, five from Gyeongseong and four each from Mitsubishi and Hitachi's Kasato works; the last of these became the largest producer of Tehoro class locomotives. Another eighteen were delivered in 1937, nine each from Hitachi Kasato and Kawasaki, and in 1938, as part of Sentetsu's general renumbering, the Tehoro class locomotives in service received numbers テホロ1 through テホロ39. Finally, between 1939 and 1941, 56 more were delivered, mostly from Hitachi Kasato.

The Tehoro class was a notable milestone in the history of Korea's railways. As the first type designed and produced entirely by domestic (Korean and Japanese) factories, it gave Japanese and Korean designers extensive experience which was subsequently applied to the development of the Pashishi and Mikasa-class locomotives.

Postwar

Korean National Railroad 터우6 (Teou6) class
The exact dispersal of the Tehoko-class locomotives after the partition of Korea in 1945 and the division of Sentetsu assets in 1947 is uncertain, but at least five went to the South, where the Korean National Railroad designated them 터우6 (Teou6) class  and used them until April 1955, when they were replaced by diesel locomotives.

Korean State Railway 더우유 (Tŏuyu) class
Most of the class went to the North after the partition, where they were designated 더우유 (Tŏuyu) class by the Korean State Railway, but little is known of their service lives and subsequent fates.

Construction

References

Locomotives of Korea
Locomotives of South Korea
Locomotives of North Korea
Railway locomotives introduced in 1927
4-6-0 locomotives
Gyeongseong Works locomotives
Hitachi locomotives
Kawasaki locomotives
Mitsubishi locomotives